2014–15 Syed Mushtaq Ali Trophy was the seventh edition of the Syed Mushtaq Ali Trophy competition, an Indian domestic team only Twenty20 cricket tournament in India. It was contested by 27 teams.

Format
The teams were divided into five zonal groups: Central, East, North, South and West. All group stage matches were held at a single host city within that zone: Indore (Central), Cuttack (East), Delhi (North), Kochi (South) and Pune (West).

Group stage

Central Zone

East Zone

North Zone

South Zone

West Zone

  Qualified for Super League

Super league stage

Group A

Group B

Final

References

External links
Tournament page of Cricinfo

Syed Mushtaq Ali Trophy
Syed Mushtaq Ali Trophy